Jim Caple is a former columnist and senior writer for ESPN.com. He has worked previously with the Seattle Post-Intelligencer and the St. Paul Pioneer Press.

Caple attended R.A. Long High School in Longview, Washington. He graduated from the University of Washington in Seattle, where he reported for and later became an editor of the school newspaper, "The Daily".

Caple has written a book The Devil Wears Pinstripes which, according to Amazon.com, "takes on the rabid fans of baseball's twenty-six-time World Champions, and offers a decidedly different slant on the New York Yankees—the losers of thirteen World Series."

References

External links

 Caple's columns on ESPN.com

Living people
The Daily of the University of Washington alumni
American sportswriters
People from Longview, Washington
Year of birth missing (living people)